Mycetoporini is a tribe of crab-like rove beetles in the family Staphylinidae. There are about 8 genera and at least 20 described species in Mycetoporini.

Genera
These eight genera belong to the tribe Mycetoporini:
 Bolitobius Leach, 1819 c g b
 Bolitopunctus Campbell, 1993 g b
 Bryoporus Kraatz, 1857 c g b
 Carphacis Gozis, 1886 c g b
 Ischnosoma Stephens, 1829 g b
 Lordithon Thomson, 1859 c g b
 Mycetoporus Mannerheim, 1830 c g b
 Neobolitobius Campbell, 1993 g b
Data sources: i = ITIS, c = Catalogue of Life, g = GBIF, b = Bugguide.net

References

Further reading

External links

 

Tachyporinae
Beetle tribes